Alexander Wilkin (December 1, 1819 – July 14, 1864) was a soldier during the Mexican–American War and the American Civil War. Wilkin also played a role in the development of the Minnesota Territory, having been its second territorial secretary from 1851 till 1853. In 1861, he was deployed in the Civil War, where he would die at the Battle of Tupelo.

Life
Wilkin was born on December 1, 1819, in Goshen, New York. His father Samuel J. Wilkin as well as his grandfather James W. Wilkin were politicians. Alexander studied law at Yale and became an attorney. In 1847, he joined the Tenth United States Army and became a captain. The army was deployed to Northern Mexico. Wilkin saw little action during his deployment, but gained a reputation as a serious soldier, and a man not to trifle with. However, on January 20, 1848, he shot and killed Joshua W. Collett in a duel. Despite his later regrets, he quoted that he "never felt cooler in his life".

On March 6, 1848, he resigned his post and moved to Saint Paul, Minnesota Territory, in 1849. Two years later, President Millard Fillmore gave him the office of territorial secretary of the Minnesota Territory. The office was given to him presumably as a political favor (Wilkin was a Whig), and he served the office until 1853. While living in St. Paul, Wilkin invested in land, railroads, and newspapers. He worked as a lawyer and insurance agent. He also created the St. Paul Fire and Marine Insurance Company, the forerunner of what would become Travelers Insurance.

When the Civil War began in April 1861, he was elected head of the "Pioneer Guard", the name of a St. Paul-based militia unit. On July 21, 1861, Wilkin fought in the ill-fated Battle of Bull Run, in which the Union forces were defeated. For his bravery during the battle Wilkin was made a captain in the regular army. Before he could report, he received a promotion to major with the 2nd Minnesota Volunteer Infantry. This new regiment, based in Lebanon, Kentucky, fought in the Battle of Mill Springs on January 18, 1862. When Wilkin's regiment was asked to intervene in a siege in Corinth, Mississippi, where he served with General Tecumseh Sherman. Shortly afterward, the 9th Minnesota Volunteer Infantry Regiment elected him colonel, and on December 26, 1862, he commanded nearly 250 soldiers at the execution of 38 Dakota men in Mankato, Minnesota. He then established his headquarters as well as a military training school in St. Peter.

In October 1863, the Ninth Minnesota were sent to Missouri. The following May, the regiment marched to Memphis, Tennessee, and raised an army tasked with eliminating the threat that Nathan Bedford Forrest's cavalry was posing to the area. On June 10, 1864, Wilkin fought at the Battle of Brice's Crossroads which earned him praise for his bravery despite the Confederate victory. On July 14, 1864, he would face the battle that would come to be his last. Another expeditionary force decided to operate against Forrest. This force, operated by Wilkin, headed to Tupelo, Mississippi, where he was shot to death while speaking to another soldier. He was buried near where he fell, but his family recovered his remains and brought them to Goshen, where he was born. His father, Samuel Wilkin, outlived him by 20 months before he died in 1866. In 1868, Wilkin County, Minnesota, was formed as a way to honor the leader. A statue of him was erected in the state capitol in 1910.

References

1819 births
1864 deaths
American military personnel of the Mexican–American War
People of Minnesota in the American Civil War
People of New York (state) in the American Civil War
People from Saint Paul, Minnesota
People from Goshen, New York
Yale Law School alumni
Businesspeople from Minnesota
Minnesota lawyers
New York (state) lawyers
Minnesota Whigs
19th-century American politicians
New York (state) Whigs
Minnesota Territory officials
Union Army colonels
United States politicians killed during the Civil War
19th-century American businesspeople
19th-century American lawyers